Riverside Colony is a Hutterite colony and census-designated place (CDP) in Beadle County, South Dakota, United States. It was first listed as a CDP prior to the 2020 census. The population of the CDP was 72 at the 2020 census.

It is in northeastern Beadle County, on the west side of the James River.

Demographics

References 

Census-designated places in Beadle County, South Dakota
Census-designated places in South Dakota
Hutterite communities in the United States